Jeżów is a settlement in Gmina Bolków, Jawor County, Lower Silesian Voivodeship, in south-western Poland.

From 1975 to 1998 the village was in Jelenia Góra Voivodeship.

Gallery

References
Map of the Gmina Bolków

External links 

Villages in Jawor County

pl:Jeżów